The 2005 NCAA Division III women's basketball tournament was the 24th annual tournament hosted by the NCAA to determine the national champion of Division III women's collegiate basketball in the United States.

Millikin defeated Randolph-Macon in the championship game, 70–50, to claim the Big Blue's first Division III national title.

The championship rounds were hosted by Virginia Wesleyan College in Norfolk, Virginia.

Bracket

Final Four

All-tournament team
 Joanna Conner, Millikin
 Audrey Minott, Millikin
 Lindsay Ippel, Millikin
 Megan Silva, Randolph-Macon
 Megan Myles, Southern Maine

See also
 2005 NCAA Division I women's basketball tournament
 2005 NCAA Division II women's basketball tournament
 2005 NAIA Division I women's basketball tournament
 2005 NAIA Division II women's basketball tournament
 2005 NCAA Division III men's basketball tournament

References

 
NCAA Division III women's basketball tournament
2005 in sports in Virginia
Millikin Big Blue